Michael Traynor (born December 12, 1975) is an American actor and dancer known for his roles on The Walking Dead, Rectify and The Fosters.

Career

Traynor began his career as a dancer, receiving dance scholarships and dancing professionally for a few years, but after performing in a few small acting roles he decided to become an actor. His most notable roles are Nicholas on The Walking Dead, George Melton on Rectify and Craig on The Fosters.

Filmography

Film

Television

References

External links
 

1975 births
Living people
21st-century American male actors
American male film actors
American male television actors
Male actors from Fort Lauderdale, Florida
American male dancers